Dennon Elliot Lewis (born 9 May 1997) is an English footballer who plays for Boreham Wood as a wingback.

A former professional at Premier League side Watford, Lewis had loan spells at Woking and Crawley Town between 2016 and 2017. He then had a spell with Scottish club Falkirk in 2018, before joining Wealdstone in June 2019, following a brief stint with Bromley. He signed for Boreham Wood in November 2021

Club career

Watford
Lewis joined the Academy at Watford in 2008, and progressed through the ranks to sign his first (three-year) professional contract in July 2015. He played all along the right-flank for the under-21s during the 2015–16 campaign, making a total of 29 appearances.

On 28 July 2016, he joined National League club Woking on a season-long loan. He made his first team debut on 6 August, in a 3–1 defeat to Lincoln City at the Kingfield Stadium. He scored his first senior goal seven days later, in a 2–1 defeat at Southport. Between 3 September to 13 September he scored in three consecutive games, against Macclesfield Town, Guiseley and Torquay United. On 28 January, he received the first red card of his career when he was dismissed for two bookable offences in a 1–0 victory at Eastleigh. Lewis scored four goals from 33 appearances as Woking posted an 18th-place finish in the 2016–17 season. 

On 6 July 2017, he joined EFL League Two side Crawley Town on loan until the end of the year. He had previously played under "Red Devils" manager Harry Kewell when Kewell worked at the Watford Academy. He made his debut in the English Football League on 5 August, coming on as a 75th-minute substitute for Enzio Boldewijn in a 3–1 defeat to Port Vale at Broadfield Stadium.

On 13 April 2018, it was announced that Lewis would leave Watford at the conclusion of his contract in June 2018.

Falkirk
Lewis signed a one-year contract with Scottish Championship club Falkirk, effective from 1 July 2018. On 14 July 2018, Lewis made his Falkirk debut during their 1–0 home defeat to Montrose in the Scottish League Cup and three days later scored his first goal in their 2–0 victory over Forfar Athletic. In November 2018, Lewis spoke out about the alleged racist abuse he received from Falkirk's own fans. Police Scotland later charged a 34 year old with breach of the peace, though stated there was insufficient evidence to prove any racist intent.

Wealdstone
On 15 June 2019, following a brief spell with National League side, Bromley, Lewis joined National League South side, Wealdstone. He went onto make his debut for the club during a 4–1 home victory over Dartford on the opening day of the 2019–20 campaign, in which he scored in the 76th minute to give the hosts a 2–1 lead. Lewis went onto net ten more times in the league for the Stones, in a campaign which was prematurely ended due to emergence of the COVID-19 pandemic.

On 10 September 2020, following the club's promotion to the National League, Lewis signed a new two-year deal. On 5 April 2021, Lewis scored a brace against rivals Barnet, and netted a total of 5 times in 40 league appearances in the 2020-21 season.

Lewis started the 2021-22 season playing in a left wingback role. On 4 September 2021 he scored his first goal of the season against Dagenham & Redbridge, and appeared in all of Wealdstone's first 13 league games before leaving the club

Boreham Wood
On 9 November 2021, Lewis signed for fellow National League side Boreham Wood.

Career statistics

Love Island
In 2019, Lewis participated in the fifth series of the ITV2 reality series Love Island.

References

External links

1997 births
Living people
Footballers from the London Borough of Brent
English footballers
Association football utility players
Watford F.C. players
Woking F.C. players
Crawley Town F.C. players
Falkirk F.C. players
Bromley F.C. players
Wealdstone F.C. players
Boreham Wood F.C. players
National League (English football) players
English Football League players
Association football forwards
Love Island (2015 TV series) contestants